Peroz III ( Pērōz) was son of Yazdegerd III, the last Sasanian King of Kings of Iran. After the death of his father, who legend says was killed by a miller at the instigation of the governor of Marw, he retreated to territory under the control of Tang China. He served as a Tang general and the head of the Governorate of Iran, an exiled extension of the Sassanid court. Most of what is known of Peroz III is written in the Old Book of Tang and the New Book of Tang.

Life
Prince Peroz was born in 636, and was thus very young at the time of the reign of his father king Yazdegerd III and never exercised the imperial power of the Sasanians. After the Muslim conquest of Iran, Peroz and much of the imperial family escaped through the Pamir Mountains in what is now Tajikistan and arrived at Tang China, which was more supportive of the Sasanians.

According to the Old Book of Tang, Peroz asked for military help from Tang China against the Arabs in 661. The Tang court created the Area Command of Persia (波斯都督府) at what is now Zaranj/Zābol (疾陵城 Jilingcheng) (on the modern border of Afghanistan and Iran), with Peroz as commander-in-chief (都督 Dudu) Between 670 and 674, Peroz arrived personally at the Tang court and was given the title of Yòuwǔwèi Jīangjūn (右武衛將軍, "Martial General of the Right [Flank] Guards"). The imperial court allowed Sassanian refugees fleeing from the Arab conquest to settle in China. The Emperor of China at this time was Emperor Gaozong of Tang.

In 678, the deputy minister for personnel of the Tang court, Pei Xingjian, a noble from Hedong Commandery, was ordered to escort Peroz back to Persia. Pei Xingjian got as far as Suiye (near modern Tokmok, Kyrgyzstan) before returning, while Peroz was forced to spend over 20 years in Tokhara (吐火羅; likely Bactra or Tokharistan) with several thousand followers. In 708 Peroz arrived at the Tang court again and was given the title of Zuoweiwei Jiangjun (左威衛將軍 Awe-inspiring General of the Left [Flank] Guards).

However, according to the biography of Pei Xingjian, Pei, when briefing the political situation of Persia to Emperor Gaozong, stated that Peroz died before the year of 678.  The Persian prince who was escorted was Narsieh, according to Pei Xingjian.

Death

According to the New Book of Tang, Peroz died after receiving the title Youwuwei Jiangjun. It was then that Peroz's son, Narsieh, a hostage at the Tang court, was escorted by Pei Xingjian westwards to Persia in 679 (not 678). As with the Old Book of Tang, Pei got as far as Suiye, and Narsieh (not Peroz) then spent 20 years in Tokhara. Finally, it was again Narsieh and not Peroz who received the title of Zuoweiwei Jiangjun.

A statue of him and another Persian ("Nanmei") was erected at the Qianling Mausoleum.

Descendants

Narsieh adopted the Tang imperial family name Li.

Peroz's son, Khosrau, is mentioned by the Arab historians as accompanying the Turgesh in their wars against the Arabs in Transoxiana. During the Siege of Kamarja in 729, he tried to achieve the surrender of the Arab garrison, but his offer was rejected with scorn.

References

Sources 
 
 
 
 
 

Sasanian princes
Tang dynasty generals
7th-century Iranian people
636 births
679 deaths